Taua may refer to:

In places
 Tauá, a small municipality in the state of Ceará in the Northeast region of Brazil 
 Tauá (Rio de Janeiro), a neighborhood in Rio de Janeiro, Brazil
 Santo Antônio do Tauá, a municipality in the state of Pará in the Northern region of Brazil 
 Mata Taua Peak, a peak in Antarctica

In people
 Tauã (footballer) (b. 1995), a Brazilian footballer
 Vai Taua (b. 1988), an American football player
 Wiremu Hoani Taua (1862–1919), a New Zealand tribal leader

In other uses
 Taua, a war party in the tradition of the Māori 
 Taua, a 2007 New Zealand short film (aka War Party) written and directed by Te Arepa Kahi; see 
 Oenomaus taua, a species of butterfly
 Waka taua, Māori war canoe